Annuloceras ("Ringed Horns") is an extinct genus of ammonite cephalopod.  Its fossils are found in Lower Barremian sediments from California.  The genus is currently placed in the family Aegocrioceratidae.

Annuloceras is a heteromorph ammonite similar in form to other heteroceratids except that the early helix is more loosely wound. Macroscaphites differs in that the early portion is planispiral and tightly wound.  Contemporary Shastoceras, found the same strata in California, differs in lacking a coiled juvenile section.

References

A New Heteromorph Ammonite from the Barremian (Cretaceous) of California Michael A. Murphy, Peter U. Rodda, Patrick Embree Journal of Paleontology, Vol. 69, No. 6 (Nov., 1995), pp. 1179–1182 abstract

Ammonitida genera
Early Cretaceous ammonites of North America
Heteromorphic ammonites
Barremian life